Monument to Time End is the second album by the black metal band Twilight. It was released in 2010.

Track listing

Credits
Neill Jameson - Vocals
Aaron Turner - Vocals, guitars, effects
Stavros Giannopoulos - Guitars
Sanford Parker - Keyboards, effects
Wrest - Drums, Bass, guitars
Blake Judd - Guitars, vocals

References

2010 albums